Hypsometric is a scientific term relating to the measurement of heights. The term originates from the Greek word  "hypsos" meaning height and the word metre is from the Greek  (métron), "a measure". 

Hypsometric curve is a histogram of elevations of a landscape
Hypsometric equation relates pressure to height in the atmosphere
Hypsometric tints are a technique of showing elevation on maps

A Hypsometer is an instrument for measuring altitude using the boiling point of a liquid.